Creo or CREO may refer to:

 Creo (company), a Canadian company for imaging technology now part of Eastman Kodak Comp
 Creo (trade union), a Norwegian trade union for arts workers
 Commitment, Renewal and Order, a political party in Guatemala
 Creating Opportunities, a political party in Ecuador
 PTC Creo, a suite of design software
 Creo (artist), an Austrian electronic music artist

See also 
 Cleo (disambiguation)
 Creel (disambiguation)
 Creole (disambiguation)
 CRIO
 KREO (disambiguation)
 Krio (disambiguation)